Albert Tuisue (born 6 June 1993) is a Fijian professional rugby union player who currently plays for Gloucester in Premiership Rugby. He plays as lock or back row. He is known for his aggression on the field.

Background
Tuisue gave up his career as a police officer in Fiji in order to pursue a career in Rugby.

Playing career
He played in the Shute Shield and the NRC before joining Fijian Drua making his Fiji debut in 2018. He won the 2018 NRC championship with Drua. In the final at Churchill Park, Lautoka against Queensland Country he was Man of the Match.

Tuisue signed for London Irish in 2019. He became a regular in the London Irish side, making 24 appearances and scoring 8 tries in the 2019/20 season. He made his 50th appearance for the club against Exeter Chiefs in the 2020/21 Premiership season.

On 17 January 2022, Tuisue signed for Premiership rivals Gloucester ahead of the 2022-23 season.

References

External links
 
itsrugby Profile

1993 births
Living people
Fijian rugby union players
London Irish players
Fiji international rugby union players
Fijian Drua players
Rugby union locks